The 1997 European Judo Championships were the 8th edition of the European Judo Championships, and were held in Ostend, Belgium on 11 May 1997.

Medal overview

Men

Women

Medal table

Results overview

Men

60 kg

65 kg

71 kg

78 kg

86 kg

95 kg

+95 kg

Open class

Women

48 kg

52 kg

56 kg

61 kg

66 kg

72 kg

+72 kg

Open class

References

External links
 

E
European Judo Championships
European Judo Championships
International sports competitions hosted by Belgium
Sport in Ostend
Judo competitions in Belgium
European Judo Championships